Protima Gauri Bedi
(12 October 1948 – 18 August 1998) was an Indian model turned Odissi exponent. In 1990, she established Nrityagram, a dance school in Bangalore.

Early life 
Protima was born in Delhi, the second of four siblings, three daughters and a son. Her father was Laxmichand Gupta, a trader belonging to a business family from Karnal district, Haryana, and her mother Reba, a Bengali.

In 1953, her family moved to Goa, and in 1957, to Bombay. At age nine, she was sent to stay at her aunt's in a village in the Karnal district for a while where she studied in a local school. On her return, she was sent to Kimmins High School, Panchgani, where she received her early education. She graduated from St. Xavier's College, Bombay (1965–67).

Career

Modeling career 
By the late 1960s, she was a worked as a model. In 1974, she came into the news for streaking during the daytime for the launch of the Bollywood magazine Cineblitz at Juhu Beach in Bombay.

Dance career 

In August 1975, at the age of 26, viewing an Odissi dance recital changed her life, inspiring her become a student of Guru Kelucharan Mohapatra. Under the Guru's tutelage, she learnt the art of dancing, practicing for 12 to 14 hours a day.

To perfect her dance, she started studying abhinaya from Guru Kalanidhi Narayanan of Madras. From then on, she started giving performances around the country. Around the same time, Protima started her own dance school at Prithvi Theatre in Juhu, Mumbai. It later became the Odissi Dance Centre.

Nrityagram 

Nrityagram, situated on the outskirts of Bangalore, became India's first free dance gurukul, village for various Indian classical dances, consisting of seven gurukuls for the seven classical dance styles and two martial arts forms, Chhau and Kalaripayattu. Nrityagram was inaugurated on 11 May 1990, by the then-Prime Minister, V.P. Singh. The dance school has a small community of students from all parts of India, but with a common aim of dance. The Nrityagram ensemble was soon performing all over the world. Meanwhile, in 1992, Protima appeared in Pamela Rooks's English film, Miss Beatty's Children.

Nrityagram, created as a model dance village, was constructed by architect Gerard da Cunha. It won the Best Rural Architecture award in 1991. To raise funds to run Nrityagram, the tourist resort Kuteeram was built in 1992. Nrityagram is also the venue of the annual dance festival Vasanta Habba, which was first started in 1994 and had 40,000 visitors when it was last held in 2004. It was not held from 2005 to 2007, due to the advent of the 2004 tsunami and a shortage of funds.

Final years 
Protima's son, Siddarth, suffered from schizophrenia and committed suicide in July 1997 while he was studying in North Carolina. This caused her to announce her retirement and change her name to Protima Gauri. Soon she started travelling in the Himalayan region, starting in Leh. In a newspaper interview given in April 1998, while camping at Rishikesh during the Kumbh Mela, she said, "I have decided to give myself up to the Himalayas. It is the call of the mountains which has beckoned me to them. And who knows what may come out of it? It is bound to be something good." Subsequently, in August, Protima Gauri set off on her pilgrimage to Kailash Mansarovar, and it was there that she disappeared after the Malpa landslide, near Pithoragarh, in the Himalayas. Her remains and belongings were recovered after several days, along with seven other bodies found in the landslide.

In her autobiography, Timepass, based on her journals and letters collated and published by her daughter, Pooja Bedi, in 2000, she gives an account of her relationships and lifestyle, the birth of her dream project, Nrityagram, and her eventual transition into a sanyasin towards the end of her life, when she retired from public life and wanted to explore the Himalayas.

Personal life 
Protima Bedi met Kabir Bedi during her modeling career. After a few months, she left her parents' house to live with him. She married Kabir and had two children - including Pooja Bedi. They separated in 1974.

See also 
 Indian women in dance

Notes

References 
 Time Pass: The Memoirs of Protima Bedi, with Pooja Bedi Ebrahim. New Delhi, Penguin, 2000. .

External links 

 
 An Interview with Protima Gauri
 Special feature on Protima Bedi

1948 births
1998 deaths
Bedi Protima
Deaths in landslides
St. Xavier's College, Mumbai alumni
Odissi exponents
Indian female classical dancers
Bengali models
Indian Hindus
Performers of Indian classical dance
Dancers from Delhi
20th-century Indian dancers
Women artists from Delhi
20th-century Indian women artists
Natural disaster deaths in India